Joel Soisson is an American filmmaker. He works primarily in the field of independent film. His numerous credits include Dracula 2000, A Nightmare on Elm Street 2: Freddy's Revenge, Bill & Ted's Excellent Adventure, The Prophecy, Little Pink House and Buffalo Rider.

Biography

Education
Soisson studied fine arts and character animation at Pratt Institute and film studies at the University of Southern California and the American Film Institute.

Movie career
Soisson has written, produced, and directed numerous feature films since producing Bill & Ted's Excellent Adventure (1989). He worked extensively with production companies such as New Line Cinema, De Laurentiis Entertainment Group and The Weinstein Company before making films under his own banner, Neo Art & Logic, where he helped produce and finance Sweet Jane (1998) and the documentary feature Trekkies (1997).

Mr. Soisson was featured prominently in season 3 of the reality television series, Project Greenlight, which chronicled the making of the horror film, Feast, directed by then-neophyte, John Gulager. He is a longtime member of the Writers Guild of America.

Personal life
He currently lives in Bainbridge Island, Washington and works internationally. His wife, Claudia Templeton, is an actress and production accountant.

Filmography

References

External links
 

1956 births
20th-century American screenwriters
21st-century American screenwriters
AFI Conservatory alumni
Film directors from Washington (state)
Film producers from Washington (state)
Living people
Pratt Institute alumni
Screenwriters from Washington (state)
University of Southern California alumni
Writers from Bainbridge Island, Washington